Roghun is a city in Tajikistan. The city was the seat of the former Roghun District, and is part of the Districts of Republican Subordination. Its population is estimated at 14,900 for the city proper and 44,100 for the city with the outlying communities (2020).

Subdivisions
Before ca. 2018, Roghun was the seat of Roghun District, which covered the rural part of the present city of Roghun. The city of Roghun covers Roghun proper, the town Obigarm and two jamoats. These are as follows:

Climate
Roghun has a continental Mediterranean climate (Köppen: Dsb) and experiences wet and cold winters with dry cool summers.

See also
 Roghun Dam

Notes

References

Populated places in Districts of Republican Subordination